WZOE (1490 AM) is a radio station  broadcasting a News Talk Information format. Licensed to Princeton, Illinois, United States, the station serves the LaSalle-Peru area.  The station is currently owned by Fletcher Ford, through licensee Virden Broadcasting Corp., and features programming from CBS News Radio, Premiere Radio Networks and Westwood One.

References

External links

ZOE